Universomo Ltd. was a Finnish video game developer based in Tampere, Finland, founded in 2002, and acquired by THQ on May 9, 2007. Universomo also had offices in Helsinki, Finland and San Diego, United States. The studio focused on games for mobile phones, the iPhone and the N-Gage. On January 12, 2010, THQ announced the Nintendo DS title Beat City, developed by Universomo, marking the developer's first entry to the handheld gaming market.

On March 2, 2010, Universomo's closure was announced. This left THQ Wireless without any studios under its umbrella, and development of its games would be outsourced to external studios.

Universomo was best known for the favorably reviewed mobile and iPhone versions of de Blob, the mobile, iPhone and N-Gage versions of Star Wars: The Force Unleashed and the mobile versions of Lego Star Wars: The Video Game.

Games 
 Beat City
 Star Wars: Cantina Dash
 WWE Smackdown vs. Raw 2010
 Treasure Grab
 Indiana Jones and the Lost Puzzles
 Up
 Prison Tycoon
 Star Wars: The Clone Wars
 Wall-E
 Pass The Pigs
 Chop Sushi!
 Super Fruitfall
 Star Wars: The Force Unleashed
 de Blob
 Indiana Jones and the Kingdom of the Crystal Skull
 Puzzle Quest: Warlords
 Playboy Pool Party
 Snood Blaster
 Ratatouille: Cheese Rush
 Destroy All Humans! Crypto Does Vegas
 MX vs. ATV: Untamed
 Juiced 2
 Stuntman Ignition
 Ocean's 13
 Emergency Mayhem
 300: The Mobile Game
 Lego Star Wars
 Lego Star Wars II Mobile
 Stones of Khufu
 Destroy All Humans! 2
 Rollercoaster Rush
 Magic Inlay
 Bionicle Heroes
 Juiced Eliminator
 Bounce Out
 Gorillaz Entertainment System
 Habbo Creatures
 Habbo Dreams
 Get Rich or Die Tryin'''
 Gem Drop PileUp! Star Wars Battle Above Coruscant Stunt Plane Sumo Smash! Jumbo Rumble Bones Adventuring Co. Trails of Terror - Mutiny Kloner - Together in the Dark Bones - The First Adventure''

External links
Official THQ Wireless website
Official THQ website
Pocket Gamer's coverage on Universomo

References

THQ
Video game development companies
Video game companies established in 2002
Video game companies disestablished in 2010
2007 mergers and acquisitions
Defunct video game companies of Finland
Companies based in Helsinki
2002 establishments in Finland
2010 disestablishments in Finland
Companies based in Tampere